is an Internet company which is listed on the first section of the Tokyo Stock Exchange. It is also the holding company of GMO Internet Group. The head office is located in Cerulean Tower in Shibuya, Tokyo, Japan.

Overview 
While GMO Internet Group is mainly engaged in the Internet infrastructure business, it also runs other businesses such as online advertising & media, Internet financial services, mobile entertainment, and cryptocurrency. It is a market leader for domain names and web hosting services in Japan. GMO Internet Group has 9 listed companies, including the head office itself. The company operates under the corporate slogan of "Internet for Everyone" and offers employee benefits such as a 24-hour staff canteen which provides free meals, childcare facilities, and so on. Furthermore, some employees also have the option to receive their salaries in bitcoin.

History 
 was established by Masatoshi Kumagai in May 1991. In November 2013, GMO Internet acquired Gamepot, an online game company that owned Wizardry. It was shut down and absorbed into GMO Internet on December 1, 2017. Kumagai is now among the wealthiest in Japan with an estimated net worth of more than $1 billion as of June 2020.

Business Segments 
 Domain registration (Onamae.com, Muu Muu Domain, VALUE DOMAIN, Z.com, etc.)
 Web hosting (Onamae.com rental server, GMO Cloud Public, LOLIPOP!, XREA, CORE SERVER.JP, etc.)
 Internet service provider (InterQ, ZERO, Bekkoame, GMO toku toku BB, etc.)
 SSL security (GMO GlobalSign: The "GlobalSign" brand has become a recognized global brand for SSL certification.)
 Payment service (GMO Payment Gateway, GMO Epsilon, etc.)
 Online trading (GMO CLICK Securities, FXPRIME by GMO, etc.)
 Online media (Kumapon, 9199.jp, JWord, freeml, JUGEM, etc.)
 Online search (infoQ)
 Mobile entertainment (GMO GameCenter, GMO Gamepot: Absorbed into GMO Internet on December 1, 2017)
 Cryptocurrency (GMO Coin)

Group Companies 
GMO Internet has a total of 106 companies worldwide, including 9 listed companies. Some of the more prominent companies are as follows.

Internet Infrastructure 
 GMO Internet Group, Inc. (TYO: 9449)
 GMO Cloud K.K. (TYO: 3788)
 GMO Payment Gateway, Inc. (TYO: 3769)
 GMO Epsilon, Inc. 
 GMO Pepabo, Inc. (TYO: 3633)
 GMO GlobalSign NV.
GMO-Z.com USA Inc. 
GMO DigiRock
GMO Brights Consulting Inc.

Advertising & Media 
 GMO AD Partners Inc. (TYO: 4784)
 GMO AD Marketing Inc. 
 GMO Media, Inc. (TYO: 6180)
 GMO INSIGHT INC. 
 GMO NIKKO.
 GMO NIKKO AD CAMP.
 GMO UniteX Inc.
 GMO PlayAd Inc.
 GMO TECH, Inc. (TYO: 6026) 
 Shift-One, Inc.
GMO Creators Network, Inc. 
GMO Kumapon Inc. 
GMO SOLUTIONPARTNER Inc. 
GMO digitallab, Inc. 
GMO MAKESHOP Co. Ltd. 
GMO Media Inc. 
GMO Research, Inc. (TYO: 3695)

Internet Financial Services

 GMO CLICK Securities, Inc. 
 GMO Financial Holdings, Inc. (TYO: 7177)
 FX PRIME by GMO Corporation

Cryptocurrency

 GMO-Z.com Switzerland AG

Others

 GMO VenturePartners, Inc.

Z.com 
In 2014, GMO Internet Group made headlines when it bought the Z.com domain name from Nissan for US$6.8 million. It was mentioned in their press release that Z.com was acquired to spearhead GMO Internet Group's global growth strategy and provide the group with a powerful tool to build a strong global brand.

References 

Companies listed on the Tokyo Stock Exchange
Mass media companies based in Tokyo
Holding companies based in Tokyo
Mass media companies established in 1991
Japanese companies established in 1991
Holding companies established in 1991
Internet service providers of Japan
Internet technology companies of Japan